CCST most commonly refers to California Council on Science and Technology.

CCST may also refer to:

 Comboni College for Science and Technology, in Khartoum, Sudan
 Certificate of Completion of Specialist Training
 Certified Control Systems Technician, a certification program of the International Society of Automation

See also
 Ccstv